The Bigfork Chert is a Middle to Late Ordovician geologic formation in the Ouachita Mountains of Arkansas and Oklahoma. First described in 1892, this unit was not named until 1909 by Albert Homer Purdue in his study of the Ouachita Mountains of Arkansas. Purdue assigned the town of Big Fork in Montgomery County, Arkansas as the type locality, but did not designate a stratotype. As of 2017, a reference section for this unit has yet to be designated. The Bigfork Chert is known to produce planerite, turquoise, variscite, and wavellite minerals.

Paleofauna

Graptolites
 Climacograptus
 C. antiquus
 Dicellograptus
 D. divaricatus
 Diplograptus
 D. trifidus
 D. vulgatus
 Glyptograptus
 Lasiograptus
 L. flaccidus
 Mesograptus
 M. perexcavatus
 Orthograptus
 O. quadrimucronatus

See also

 List of fossiliferous stratigraphic units in Arkansas
 Paleontology in Arkansas

References

Ordovician geology of Oklahoma
Ordovician Arkansas
 
Ordovician southern paleotropical deposits